The Timpone della Motta is a hill two kilometers to the southwest of Francavilla Marittima in Calabria, Italy. It is an archaeological site which was inhabited since the Middle Bronze Age. In the Iron Age the hill was the site of an Oenotrian settlement. Over time the settlement was transformed into an important sanctuary, which was notable as the site of the first known ancient Greek temples on the Italian Peninsula. The Oenotrians were influenced by the culture of the Greek colonists from nearby Sybaris, who eventually took over the site in the second half of the seventh century. The hill was abandoned when the Bruttians conquered the region in the fourth century BC.

Geography 
The hill has an elevation of 280 meters above sea level and overlooks the coastal plain of Sibari and the Gulf of Taranto. It is on the northern bank of the seasonal Raganello river. Close to the hilltop is the acropolis, which was the location of a sanctuary with three temples. The acropolis was surrounded by a defensive wall. Several terraces with evidence of settlement are located further downhill and the Macchiabate necropolis lies at the foot of the hill. The ancient Greek city of Sybaris was located at a distance of 15 kilometers to the southeast.

History

Oenotrian period 
The oldest remains belong to a Middle Bronze Age dwelling which stood on the later site of Temple V on the acropolis. During the Iron Age in the ninth and eight centuries BC the hill was the site of a large Oenotrian settlement. Archaeological evidence indicates that a weaving house stood at the site of the Bronze Age dwelling in this period. This building was three times the size of a contemporary native hut discovered on Plateau I and might have had a religious function as well.

In the last quarter of the eight century BC this house and the other Oenotrian apsidal wooden dwellings on the acropolis were replaced by long rectangular wooden temples dedicated to Athena. The temples followed a Greek design but were constructed with native techniques. They were built around a plaza in the center, with Temple I to the northeast of the plaza, Temple V (built on the location of the weaving house) to the southwest and Temple III to the northwest. Temples I and V were built parallel to the length of the plaza, but Temple III had an entrance which faced the plaza.

These temples were the first known ancient Greek temples on the Italian Peninsula. The Greek colony Sybaris was founded around the same time, in 720 BC. There is no evidence to suggest that the site suffered a violent takeover by the Greek colonists, so it is more likely that the Oenotrians and the Greeks co-operated in the construction of the temples at a time when Greek religion was transmitted to the Oenotrian culture.

Greek takeover 
During the seventh century BC the settlement was reduced and habitation did not occur on the lower plateaus anymore, but elsewhere in the vicinity. In the second half of the seventh century BC the sanctuary was apparently taken over by the Sybarites, who celebrated large festivals there regularly. At this time a new generation of mudbrick temples was erected on top of the old wooden temples, which were demolished.

In the sixth century BC an intensive building program was started at the site leading to the construction of large colonial houses on all the plateaus and the rearrangement of the sanctuary. The mudbrick Temple V was demolished and a gravel foundation was used to eliminate the height difference of the site of Temple V with the rest of the acropolis. A new Temple V made of stone replaced the older temple. New stone temples also replaced Temple III and I, which were built on a stone foundation of riverbed cobbles.

The site must have been abandoned when the Bruttians conquered the region at some time in the fourth century BC. Centuries later a Byzantine chapel was constructed on top of the foundations of Temple V, but there is no evidence of a settlement existing in this period.

Identification as Lagaria 
Thousands of hydriskai were found on the acropolis. Because there is no natural source of water on the Timpone della Motta, these hydriskai must have been used to carry water up the hill. The images of processions seen on the pottery found at the site show women carrying water and Athena is associated with Epeius in mythology. Combined with ancient literary evidence this had led to the proposal that the Timpone della Motta was the site of Lagaria. An older source places Lagaria much further north however, near Valsinni.

Excavation 

The first excavation of the Macchiabate necropolis was started in 1963 by Paola Zancani Montuoro. She delegated the excavation of the acropolis to Maria W. Stoop and the investigation of the lower terraces to Marianne Kleibrink from 1965 onwards. The excavations were stopped in 1969 because Montuoro participated in the excavations of Sybaris. In the 1970s illegal excavations took place on large scale on the southern slope of the Timpone della Motta. Many stolen artefacts were sold on the antiquities market to private collectors and museums. Eventually these were identified and most of them were returned to the Museo Nazionale Archeologico della Sibaritide, where the finds from Timpone della Motta are exhibited.

See also 
 Magna Graecia

References

External links 
 Virtual Museum Francavilla
 International Francavilla Archaeological Project
 Information from the FastiOnline database for excavations

Ruins in Italy
Former populated places in Italy
Ancient Greek sanctuaries
Archaeological sites in Calabria